The East Savanna River is a small yet historic stream in Aitkin and Saint Louis counties in the U.S. state of Minnesota. A few thousand years ago the East Savanna was part of the Mississippi River itself, originating in northeast Minnesota and flowing southwesterly to Big Sandy Lake, from which the great river drained down its present valley to the Gulf of Mexico.

The low divide which now separates the Mississippi tributaries from the East Savanna was part of a historic trade route connecting the Saint Lawrence and Great Lakes to the Mississippi basin, used by fur traders and explorers.  Part of that route, including the headwaters of the East and West Savanna Rivers, is now within Savanna Portage State Park.

Name
The river, and the West Savanna River located a half-mile (.8 km) to the west of Wolf Lake, on the other side of the Saint Lawrence River Divide, kept the name given by French explorers, la Savanne.  This French word for savanna originally is of Native American origin, and meant a "treeless area".  The word was used here to refer to the marshy grasslands where the river begins and through which it flows.  The Ojibwe name, Mashkiig-onigami-ziibi, was more precise, being translated as "marsh-portage river".

Geology

After the recession of the last continental glacier, Lake Upham formed from glacial meltwaters.  As the lake receded, its watershed at first was drained by the Mississippi River, which rose from the northeast at the present headwaters of the Saint Louis River, and flowed southwest to Sandy Lake along the course of the East Savanna. By the process of stream piracy, the smaller Saint Louis River captured the Cloquet River and then the Mississippi east of the present divide, diverting their waters southeast to Lake Superior.  In fact, the river now known as the East Savanna reversed its course; it once was the far upper Mississippi, flowing southwesterly here on its journey to the Gulf of Mexico, but after the Saint Louis River eroded its way upward to Floodwood, it became the present small, northeastward-flowing tributary of the Saint Louis in the Saint Lawrence watershed.

Ecology
The Lake Upham lacustrine plain is part of the Tamarack Lowlands Subsection within the Northern Minnesota Drift Plains Section of the Laurentian Mixed Forest.  Sediments deposited by the glacial lake are parent to the present soils of peats, silt, and sand; the peats are in marshes which dominate the upper reaches of the river.  These marshes, in which the river rises and through which it flows, were known as the "Great Savannah".  The lower course was a winding stream with clay banks through a mixed forest; beavers dropped many trees into and across the river.

The river now flows through a channel, following the section line from Wolf Lake east for about four miles (six km), then angling northeast and east through what is now prosaically named "Judicial Ditch No. 3".  The ditching neither drained the marsh nor made it suitable for agriculture: "The land is still hopeless swamp, and so far as anyone can now see will always remain so."  As the river leaves the east boundary of Savanna Portage State Park and enters Saint Louis County, local relief begins to increase, and the channel crosses and obliterates the meanders and oxbows of the former naturally-flowing river.

History

The stream was part of the Northwest Trail, and led to the Savanna Portage, a historic trade route between the Great Lakes and the Mississippi River basin in central North America.  Members of the First Nations, and later fur traders, missionaries, and explorers, ascended the Saint Louis River from its mouth at Fond du Lac (in modern Duluth, Minnesota), then went up the East Savanna to the portage, crossed the portage and the divide to the West Savanna, and descended that stream to the Prairie River and Big Sandy Lake to the Mississippi.

In preindustrial times, the winding river was some 24 miles (about 40 km) from the Saint Louis to the start of the portage. Prior to the channelization of the river described above, Muskeg Lake, several miles to the south of the start of the portage, was considered to be the source.  In truth, both Wolf and Muskeg Lakes were open areas of water in the same enormous and impassable marsh then known as the "Great Savannah", and travellers took the portage to avoid the worst part of this marsh.  With the channelization of the river, Muskeg Lake is no longer open water, and the actual distance from the start of the portage to the river's outlet is only , as the meanders have been substantially eliminated.

See also
List of rivers of Minnesota

References

Sources
 
 Feature Detail Report for East Savanna River, Geographic Names Information System, United States Geological Survey 
 Hart, Irving Harlow (1932), "The Geologic Origin of the Savanna and Prairie River Portages", Minnesota History 13 (4): 403–07, Minnesota Historical Society.
 Hart, Irving Harlow (1927), "The Old Savanna Portage", Minnesota History 8 (2): 117–139, Minnesota Historical Society.
 Lake Information Report, Wolf Lake, Lakefinder, Minnesota Department of Natural Resources (2009)
 Le Conte, Joseph, (June Drenning Holmquist, ed.) (1951), "Joseph Le Conte's Early Geological Excursion", Minnesota History 32 (2): 81–99, Minnesota Historical Society (1951).
 
 Monk, George Henry (1807), "Some Account of the Department of Fond du Lac or Mississippi by George Henry Monk Esq", accompanying an 18 April 1807 letter to Roderic Mackenzie, a partner in the North West Company. This report is reprinted in Minnesota History 5 (1): 32–39, Minnesota Historical Society (February 1923). 
 
 Oliphant, Laurence (1855), Minnesota and the Far West, London: William Blackwood and Sons.
 
 
 
 
 
 

Rivers of Minnesota
Rivers of Aitkin County, Minnesota
Rivers of St. Louis County, Minnesota
Tributaries of Lake Superior